Llano Independent School District is a public school district based in Llano, Texas (USA).

In addition to Llano, the district serves the city of Sunrise Beach Village, the community of Kingsland, and a portion of Horseshoe Bay as well as most rural areas in Llano County.

In 2009, the school district was rated "academically acceptable" by the Texas Education Agency.

Schools
Llano ISD has four schools - three in the city of Llano and one in Kingsland.  Their school colors are orange and black and their mascot is the Yellow Jacket.

High school

AAAA
 Llano High School (Llano; Grades 9-12)
A new high school was built in 2000 with classes beginning Fall 2000. The previous high school is now the middle school just down the road. The Yellow Jacket football team still plays at Llano Stadium next to the middle school. The tennis courts, which were recently remodeled, are also located by Llano Middle School.

Middle school

 Llano Junior High School (Llano; Grades 6-8)

Primary schools

 Llano Elementary School (Llano; Grades PK-5)
 Packsaddle Elementary School (Kingsland; Grades PK-5)

References

External links
Llano ISD

School districts in Llano County, Texas